Derris elegans is a species of leguminous plants. It is found in Papua New Guinea.

References

External links 

 Derris elegans at The Plant List
 Derris elegans at Tropicos

Millettieae
Plants described in 1852
Flora of Papua New Guinea
Taxa named by Friedrich Anton Wilhelm Miquel